Abdul Kadir Khanzada is a Pakistani politician who was a member of the National Assembly of Pakistan from 2002 to 2013.

Political career
He was elected to the National Assembly of Pakistan from Constituency NA-242 (Karachi-IV) as a candidate of Muttahida Qaumi Movement (MQM) in by-polls held in January 2003. He received 67,051 votes and defeated Meraj Ul Huda Siddiqui, a candidate of Muttahida Majlis-e-Amal (MMA). He was made parliamentary secretary for communication in 2003.

He was re-elected to the National Assembly from Constituency NA-242 (Karachi-IV) as a candidate of MQM in 2008 Pakistani general election. He received 147,892 votes and defeated Muhammad Afaque Khan, a candidate of Pakistan Peoples Party (PPP).

Personal life
Khanzada's family originated from Alwar in Rajasthan, from where they migrated to Pakistan. He is a direct descendant of Raja Nahar Khan.

References

Living people
Year of birth missing (living people)
Place of birth missing (living people)
Pakistani MNAs 2002–2007
Pakistani MNAs 2008–2013
Pakistani people of Rajasthani descent
Muttahida Qaumi Movement MNAs
Muttahida Qaumi Movement politicians